Birikim (Turkish: Accumulation) is a leftist magazine which has existed since 1975 in Turkey. It was banned by the military authorities in 1980 immediately after the coup. The magazine resumed its publication in 1989. It was a print magazine under the subtitle Aylık sosyalist kültür dergisi (Turkish: Monthly socialist cultural journal) until 2005 when it was redesigned as an online publication.

History and profile
Birikim was started by a group of Turkish Marxists, including Ömer Laçiner and Murat Belge, in 1975, and its first issue appeared on 1 March that year. The magazine was initially headquartered in Ankara. Its publisher is Birikim Publications which also produces other titles, including Toplum and Bilim (Turkish: Society and Science). One of the goals set for Birikim was to redefine socialism based on a critical approach towards Kemalism.  Therefore, it managed to develop its own approach without being part of any fractions within the Marxism in Turkey.

The magazine was banned immediately after the 1980 military coup in Turkey and was relaunched in 1989. In its second phase Birikim writers became closer to neoliberalism which they regarded as a very successful approach not only in economics but also in political arena. This shift was partly a consequence of the dissolution of the Soviet Union.

Contributors and editors
Onat Kutlar was among the regular contributors of Birikim in its first period between 1975 and 1980. Some of the major contributors in the second period have included Tanıl Bora and Ahmet İnsel. In 1993 Birikim published the writings of Slavoj Žižek, a Slovenian philosopher and cultural theorist, in Turkish for the first time.

As of 2005 Ömer Laçiner was serving as its editor-in-chief.

References

External links
 

1975 establishments in Turkey
1980 disestablishments in Turkey
1989 establishments in Turkey
Banned magazines
Magazines established in 1975
Magazines disestablished in 1980
Magazines established in 1989
Magazines disestablished in 2005
Magazines published in Ankara
Magazines published in Istanbul
Defunct political magazines published in Turkey
Marxist magazines
Turkish-language magazines
Monthly magazines published in Turkey
Online magazines with defunct print editions